Hutbay is the capital of Little Andaman in India. There are a number of government offices in the city, such as the Tehsildar office, Zila Parishad. The island's bus-stand is housed here.

It is within the Andaman and Nicobar Islands.  It contains the second largest palm plantation (dalda plantation) in Asia and largest in India.  It has Asia's second highest lighthouse. It is situated beside the Ten Degree Channel.

This island is about 120 kilometers from Port Blair by sea. It houses several tourism destinations, including Kala Paththar, Butler Bay Beach and white surf waterfalls.

Cities and towns in South Andaman district
South Andaman district